Happy Birthday may refer to:

 "Happy birthday", an expression of good will offered on a person's birthday

Film, theatre and television
 Happy Birthday (1998 film), a Russian drama by Larisa Sadilova
 Happy Birthday, a 2001 film featuring John Goodman and directed by Helen Mirren
 Happy Birthday (2002 film), an American film by Yen Tan
 Happy Birthday, a 2005 film featuring Kousei Amano
 Happy Birthday, a 2006 Hong Kong film starring Louis Koo
 Happy Birthday, a 2007 French short film co-directed by Hichem Yacoubi
 Happy Birthday, a 2008 Thai film
 Happy Birthday (2009 film), a Maldivian suspense thriller
 Happy Birthday (2016 Indian film), an Indian Kannada-language film
 Happy Birthday (2016 American film), a horror-thriller
 Happy Birthday (2022 Indian film), an Indian Telugu-language crime comedy film
 Happy Birthday (2022 Sri Lankan film), a Sri Lankan mystery thriller
 Happy Birthday (play), a 1946 Broadway play by Anita Loos
 Happy Birthday (TV series), a 2018 Thai television series
 "Happy Birthday" (CSI: Miami), an episode of CSI: Miami
 "Happy Birthday" (Roseanne), an episode of Roseanne

Music

Albums
 Happy Birthday (Altered Images album) or the title song (see below), 1981
 Happy Birthday (Pete Townshend album), 1970
 Happy Birthday (Sharon, Lois & Bram album), 1988
 Happy Birthday!, by Modeselektor, or the title song, 2007
 Happy Birthday (mixtape), by Tinie Tempah, or the title track, 2011
 Happy Birthday, by the Burning Hell, 2008
 Happy Birthday, by Cookies, 2002

Songs
 "Happy Birthday to You", a traditional song from 1893 or earlier, also known as "Happy Birthday"
 "Happy Birthday" (Altered Images song), 1981
 "Happy Birthday" (Birthday Party song), 1980
 "Happy Birthday" (The Click Five song), 2007
 "Happy Birthday" (Concrete Blonde song), 1989
 "Happy Birthday" (Flipsyde song), 2005
 "Happy Birthday" (Loretta Lynn song), 1964
 "Happy Birthday" (NEWS song), 2008
 "Happy Birthday" (Stevie Wonder song), 1980
 "Happy Birthday", by B'z from Monster, 2006
 "Happy Birthday", by the Birthday Massacre from Nothing and Nowhere, 2002
 "Happy Birthday", by Carly Simon from Have You Seen Me Lately, 1990
 "Happy Birthday", by Gary Glitter from Touch Me, 1973
 "Happy Birthday", by Lenny Kravitz from Strut, 2014
 "Happy Birthday", by R. Kelly, 2015
 "Happy Birthday", by So Def featuring Izza Kizza and Missy Elliott, 2007
 "Happy Birthday", by Sufjan Stevens from A Sun Came, 1999
 "Happy Birthday", by Technohead, 1996
 "Happy Birthday", by "Weird Al" Yankovic from "Weird Al" Yankovic, 1983
 "Happy Birthday", by Woo Jin-young, 2021
 "Yom Huledet (Happy Birthday)", by Eden, representing Israel in the Eurovision Song Contest 1999

See also
 Birthday (disambiguation)
 "Happy Birthday, Mr. President", a version of "Happy Birthday to You" sung by Marilyn Monroe for U.S. President John F. Kennedy in 1962
 Happy Birthday to You!, a 1959 book by Dr. Seuss
 "The Happy Birthday Song", a song by Andrew Bird from Andrew Bird & the Mysterious Production of Eggs